Eden II Programs is an agency that serves children and adults diagnosed with an autism spectrum disorder throughout New York City and Long Island. Eden II was founded by six families in 1976, beginning on Staten Island with just six children and one special education teacher. The mission of Eden II Programs is to support people with autism throughout their lives to achieve their full potential through service, science, and passion. Over the past 40 years, Eden II's highly successful model has led to the expansion and development of a number of programs and services for individuals with autism. In 1994, Eden II opened its preschool program to serve children with autism, ages 3–5. This intensive program focuses on learning readiness skills, academics, social and self-help skills.

Realizing a need for services on Long Island, the Genesis School, an educational annex of Eden II, opened in Plainview, New York in September 1995. Initially serving twelve students, the Genesis School now provides educational, residential and outreach services to more than 100 individuals throughout Long Island. Eden II employs more than 400 full-time and 200 part-time staff and greatly benefits from a number of volunteers, including its board of directors.

Eden II developed its Adult Services Program in 1982 to meet the needs of individuals with autism who have aged out of the school system. Longitudinal studies have shown adults living with autism may require ongoing support for daily living skills in order to experience a good quality of life. This program is a highly specialized program designed to serve those individuals with the most significant challenges, often excluded from all other options. Today, Eden II serves over 90 young men and women in its Adult Services Programs. 
In 1993, Eden II developed its first residence for ten young men with autism. This house was developed in response to Eden II's mission statement: to serve individuals with autism and their families across their lifespans. Eden II opened its second residence in 2003, serving six children with autism, and had opened three more residences by 2010. Eden II is committed to serving not only the needs of individuals with autism but also the needs of their families. To that end, Eden II developed its Family Support Department in 1984. This program began with a small parent training class and some respite trips serving approximately 15 families a year and has grown into a complex array of respite services, summer camp, afterschool programs, holiday trips, service coordination and in-home habilitation programs. Currently, the Family Support Department assists more than 200 families.

References

 Taylor JL, Seltzer MM. Employment and post-secondary educational activities for young adults with autism spectrum disorders during the transition to adulthood. J Autism Dev Disord. 2011 May;41(5):566-74. . PMID 20640591; PMCID: PMC3033449.

External links
 Eden II

Schools for people on the autistic spectrum
Schools in Nassau County, New York
Special schools in the United States
Private elementary schools in Staten Island
Private middle schools in Staten Island
Private high schools in Staten Island
Autism-related organizations in the United States
1976 establishments in New York City
Educational institutions established in 1976
Mental health organizations in New York (state)